The Ministry of Commerce is the government ministry responsible for regulating and promoting commerce and trade of Cambodia. It works both domestically and internationally, and within the context of ASEAN, to create opportunities and a good working environment for producers and exporters.

General Departments
 General Department of Domestic Trade
 General Department of International Trade
 General Department of Trade Support Services
 General Directorate of Trade Promotion 
 General Department of Cambodia Import-Export Inspection and Fraud Repression (CamControl)
 General Department of Administration and Finance
 General Department of Inspection
 Green Trade Company

Minister of Commerce
 
Source: History of the Ministry of Commerce

See also
 Economy of Cambodia
 Government of Cambodia
 Pan Sorasak

References

 General Directorate of Trade Promotion of Ministry of Commerce of Cambodia

External links
 Ministry of Commerce
 Ministry of Commerce Facebook Page

Government ministries of Cambodia
Economy of Cambodia
Cambodia
Phnom Penh
Ministries established in 1996
1996 establishments in Cambodia